Butterfly Child were a Northern Irish group led by singer/songwriter Joe Cassidy, based in Chicago, Illinois. Described as "purveyors of shimmering, oceanic rock," they have released three full-length albums and numerous singles/EPs. Their latest album Futures was released by Dell'Orso Records on 27 November 2015.

History 
Butterfly Child were formed in Belfast, Northern Ireland in 1984.

After playing shows throughout Ireland, Butterfly Child released their debut EP, Toothfairy, on A.R. Kane's H.ark! label in 1991. Remarkable in its "frazzled, cracked fragility", the EP caught the ear of legendary BBC DJ John Peel, who invited the band to record their first Peel Session on 12 January 1992 at Maida Vale Studios. A second EP entitled Eucalyptus was released the same year.

The band then signed to Rough Trade Records in 1993 where they released the Ghetto Speak EP and the first full-length album, Onomatopoeia. In November 1993, Butterfly Child returned to Maida Vale for a second Peel Session. Broadcast in January 1994, the session featured two songs that would later appear on the second album.

Work began on The Honeymoon Suite in the summer of 1994, with the intent to release it that autumn. But its release was delayed due to disagreements with the record company over running order and content. After protracted discussions, the album was finally released as originally intended by Dedicated Records in 1995.

Frustrated by the experience, Cassidy relocated to Chicago  in 1997 to begin work on a third album. Soft Explosives was released in late 1998 by HitIt! Recordings, a Chicago-based label that had previously handled the US releases of the first two albums.

Following a lengthy hiatus, Butterfly Child released No Longer Living In Your Shadow as a 7" single on Dell'Orso Records in 2012.

On 15 July 2021, Joe Cassidy died of heart problems and sepsis after falling ill earlier in the month. He was 51.

Discography

References

External links
Butterfly Child at SoundCloud

Rock music groups from Northern Ireland
Musical groups from Belfast
Musical groups established in 1984
Musical groups disestablished in 2021
1984 establishments in Northern Ireland
2021 disestablishments in Northern Ireland
Dedicated Records artists
Rough Trade Records artists